Coccidiphila kasypinkeri is a moth in the family Cosmopterigidae. It is found on the Canary Islands.

Adults have been recorded in January and March.

References

Moths described in 1986
Cosmopteriginae